Khosrow Ghamari (born 13 February 1968) is an Iranian former cyclist. He competed in two events at the 1992 Summer Olympics.

References

External links
 

1968 births
Living people
Iranian male cyclists
Olympic cyclists of Iran
Cyclists at the 1992 Summer Olympics
Place of birth missing (living people)
20th-century Iranian people